Stephen Girard Park is a  park in Philadelphia, Pennsylvania, in the South Philadelphia neighborhood of Girard Estate, bounded between West Shunk, West Porter, 21st, and 22nd Streets.

In 1831 Stephen Girard died, leaving most of his immense estate to "the Mayor, Aldermen and Citizens of Philadelphia", including his country mansion, Gentilhommerie. By the 1920s, urban development had reached the area, but because Girard's will stipulated that the estate could not be sold, the city initially developed the surrounding area as rental houses. In 1951, the City received permission from Orphans Court to sell the 1920s houses and to transfer the park surrounding the mansion to the City's Fairmount Park Commission.

See also
List of parks in Philadelphia

External links

Preservation Alliance Girard Estate Walking Tour Guide Archived

References

Municipal parks in Philadelphia
South Philadelphia
1953 establishments in Pennsylvania